Dennis Bain (born 15 December 1990) is a Bahamian sprinter and hurdler from Freeport, Bahamas who competed in the 100m 200m and 110m Hurdles. He attended Jack Hayward High School in Freeport, Bahamas, before going on to compete for Abilene Christian Wildcats and later Claflin University.

Bain competed at the 2010 NACAC Under-23 Championships in Athletics in Miramar, Florida, and 2012 NACAC Under-23 Championships in Athletics in Mexico. Bain also got a silver medal at the 2009 CARIFTA Games.

Personal bests

References

External links
 World Athletics Bio
 Wild Cats Bio
 Claflin Uni Bio

1988 births
Living people
Bahamian male sprinters
Bahamian male hurdlers
People from Freeport, Bahamas
Abilene Christian University alumni
Claflin University alumni